Juliette Moinard (born 25 June 2001) is a French badminton player who competes in international level events. Her highest achievement is winning two gold medals at the 2018 European Junior Badminton Championships in Tallinn partnering with Fabien Delrue in the mixed doubles and she has won multiple titles with him. She has also played in the BWF World Junior Championships where she reached the round of 16 in the mixed doubles in 2018.

Achievements

European Junior Championships 
Mixed doubles

BWF International 
Women's doubles

Mixed doubles

  BWF International Challenge tournament
  BWF International Series tournament
  BWF Future Series tournament

References 

2001 births
Living people
Sportspeople from Marseille
Sportspeople from Strasbourg
French female badminton players
21st-century French women